On March 14, 1968, at home in St. James, the St. James Canadians corralled the Manitoba Junior Hockey League championship, and on March 26, in Selkirk, the Canadians captured the Turnbull Cup defeating the Central Manitoba Junior Hockey League champions Selkirk Steelers.

League notes
During the summer of 1967, the MAHA agreed to allow three teams to enter the WCHL: the Brandon Wheat Kings and the Flin Flon Bombers from the MJHL, and the Ben Hatskin-owned Winnipeg Jets. Hatskin also owned three MJHL teams. Part of the agreement was the continuation of the MJHL; Hatskin sold his three teams to local interests, and the Winnipeg Warriors became the West Kildonan North Stars, the St. James Braves became the St. James Canadians, and the Winnipeg Rangers became the St. Boniface Saints. These three teams joined the Winnipeg Monarchs to form the new MJHL. The Selkirk Steelers however joined the Central Manitoba Junior Hockey League.

The league dropped the final three games of the regular season in order to accommodate Memorial Cup playoff elimination series within the province with the Central Manitoba Junior Hockey League.

Regular season

Playoffs
Semi-Finals
Winnipeg lost to West Kildonan 4-games-to-1
St. Boniface lost to St. James 4-games-to-1

Final
West Kildonan lost to St. James 4-games-to-none

Turnbull Cup Championship
St. James defeated Selkirk Steelers (CMJHL) 4-games-to-2

Western Memorial Cup Semi-Final
St. James lost to Westfort Hurricanes (TBJHL) 4-games-to-2

Awards

All-Star Teams

References
Manitoba Junior Hockey League
Manitoba Hockey Hall of Fame
Hockey Hall of Fame
Winnipeg Free Press Archives
Brandon Sun Archives

MJHL
Manitoba Junior Hockey League seasons